John Daversa is an American jazz trumpeter, electronic valve instrument (EVI) player, composer, arranger, conductor, bandleader, producer and educator.

Early life 
Daversa is the son of Jay Daversa, trumpeter for Stan Kenton and Los Angeles studio musician, and Mary Ann Daversa, music educator and pianist. He was born in Los Angeles and moved to Ada, Oklahoma at age 7. He also lived in Las Vegas and Sacramento before returning to Los Angeles for high school at Hamilton Academy of Music.

Career
Daversa has degrees from UCLA, California Institute of the Arts, and a doctorate from USC. He is Chair of Studio Music and Jazz at University of Miami, Frost School of Music and directs the Frost Concert Jazz Band. Before this appointment, he taught the Jazz Studies Program at California State University, Northridge. He regularly performs with the John Daversa Progressive Big Band, John Daversa Small Band, and is a guest conductor and soloist all over the world.

Daversa has worked with Moonchild, Fiona Apple, Burt Bacharach, Joe Cocker, Andraé Crouch, Gin, Herbie Hancock, Holiday on Ice, Bob Mintzer Big Band, Renee Olstead, Regina Spektor, Andy Williams, and The Yellowjackets. His playing has been featured on film and television, including The Five-Year Engagement, Key and Peele, The King of Queens, and Promised Land.

His album American Dreamers: Voices of Hope, Music of Freedom (BFM Jazz, 2018) won three Grammy Awards at the 61st Annual Grammy Awards: Best Large Jazz Ensemble Album, "Don't Fence Me In" won in the Best Improvised Jazz Solo category, and "Stars and Stripes Forever" won in the Best Arrangement, Instrumental or A Cappella category.

Discography

As leader or co-leader 

 All Without Words: Variations Inspired by Loren, John Daversa Jazz Orchestra featuring Justin Morell, 2021
 Cuarentena: With Family at Home, John Daversa Quintet, Cuarentena: With Family at Home, 2020
 American Dreamers: Voices of Hope, Music of Freedom, John Daversa Big Band featuring DACA Artists, 2018
 Wobbly Dance Flower, John Daversa featuring Bob Mintzer, 2017
 Kaleidoscope Eyes: Music of the Beatles, John Daversa, 2016
 Artful Joy, John Daversa, 2012
 Junk Wagon: The Big Band Album, John Daversa, 2011
 Shogun Warrior, Plays for Lovers, Shogun Warrior, 2010
 Westland, Westland Trio, 2010
 Live at Catalina’s, (Vol. I), John Daversa Big Band, 2009 (Recorded live in 2000)
 Live at Catalina’s, Vol. II, John Daversa Big Band, 2000
 The D.a.M. Band, The Daversa and Morell Band, 1994

As producer or co-producer 

 Swing States: Harmony in the Battleground (Feat. Jon Batiste, John Daversa, and Harvey Mason) Regina Carter Freedom Band, 2020
 Shoulder to Shoulder: Centennial Tribute to Women’s Suffrage, Karrin Allyson Sextet, 2019
 Justin Morell Concerto for Guitar and Jazz Orchestra (feat. Adam Rogers), Frost Concert Jazz Band, Conducted by John Daversa, 2018
 Transcendence, Trinity Devi, 2018
 Europa: Explorations for Large Jazz Ensemble, Frost Concert Jazz Band, Conducted by John Daversa, 2017
 Kaleidoscope Eyes: Music of the Beatles, John Daversa, 2016
 Harmony – Venus Gong, Trinity Devi, 2015
 Oneness – Ek Ong Kar Gong, Trinity Devi, 2015
 Focus, Kendall Moore, 2014
 El Guapo, Scott Jeppesen, 2013
 Love for Sale, James Tormé, 2011
 Live at Catalina’s, (Vol. I), John Daversa Big Band, 2009 (Recorded live in 2000)
 Buck’s Vibe, Peter Buck, 2008
 Time for Christmas, Phil Crosby, Jr., 2007
 Live at Catalina’s, Vol. II, John Daversa Big Band, 2000

As band-member 

 Come Fly With Me (Single), Ledisi, Gregg Field, John Daversa, Patti Austin, Randy Waldman, Willie Murillo, Jeff Driskill, Erik Hughes, and Kate Duhamel, 2021
 LowJacked, Jackson 6, 2021
 Cheap Thrill: The Music of Rick Margitza (feat. Chuck Bergeron), South Florida Jazz Orchestra, 2020
 Swing States: Harmony in the Battleground (Feat. Jon Batiste, John Daversa, and Harvey Mason) Regina Carter Freedom Band, 2020
 Ahreum Ash Hanyou, Ahreum Ash Hanyou, 2018
 BACHanalia, Bill Cunliffe, 2017
 Life, MSM Schmidt (featuring Virgil Donati, Jimmy Haslip, Scott Kinsey, Mike Miller, Oz Noy), 2017
 Come to Paradise, Suzanne Dean, 2016
 The Deadbeats, The Deadbeats, 2016
 Inner Circle, Zach Larmer Band, 2016
 Metamorphasis, Leon Foster Thomas, 2016
 Pelos Ares, Rafael Piccolotto de Lima, Orquestra Urbana, 2016
 Get Up!, Bob Mintzer Big Band, 2015
 Self Taught, Brandon Coleman, 2015
 Exploring Mars, Josh Nelson, 2014
 Original Cities Original Jazz and Chamber Music, Mitch Haupers, 2014
 A Perfect Contradiction, Paloma Faith, 2014
 Come Over, Gina Kronstadt,2013
 Dectet: Subjects and Compliments, Justin Morell, 2013
 HighJacked, Jackson 6, 2013
 Storyteller, Nick Mancini, 2013
 Be Free, Moonchild, 2012
 Blujanova, Jeff Saxon, 2012
 Critics’ Choices and other Voices, Jazziz on Disc, 2012
 Fire It Up, Joe Cocker, 2012
 Jimmy Branly, Jimmy Branly (featuring Abraham Laboriel and Otmaro Ruiz), 2012
 Mountain Suite, Kait Dunton, 2012
 Psychobabble, Nick Mancini, 2012
 Rozalia, Nikos Syropoulos, 2012
 Tales from The Blue Whale, Endermen, 2012
 What We Saw from the Cheap Seats, Regina Spektor, 2012
 Blue Collection, Ladybug Music, 2011
 Green Collection, Ladybug Music, 2011
 The Journey, Andrae Crouch, 2011
 Purple Collection, Ladybug Music, 2011
 Timeline, Yellowjackets, 2011
 A-Me, Hire Sekine, 2010
 Numbers, Jay Daversa, 2010
 Red Collection, Ladybug Music, 2010
 Yellow Collection, Ladybug Music, 2010
 Holy Smoke, Gin Wigmore, 2009
 Pin Points and Gin Joints, The Mightly Mightly Bosstones, 2009
 The Roads We’ve Taken, International Trumpet Guild, 2009
 For My Lady, Sherman Pore, 2007
 Lamplighter, Eleisha Eagle, 2007
 Live at Café Metropole, Kim Richmond, 2007
 Soul Sistah, Marva King, 2006
 At This Time, Burt Bacharach, 2005
 Carmine Caruso International Jazz Trumpet Solo Competition (1993 – 2003), International Trumpet Guild, 2005
 Extraordinary Machine, Fiona Apple, 2005
 Broject, Jeff Babko feat. Toss Panos, 2004
 The End of Imagining, The Space Twins, 2003
 The Music of Steely Dan, Justin Morell, 2002
 Septet, Justin Morell, 2000
 Misfits of Silence, Jeff Babko, 1998
 Variety Arts Center – Los Angeles, Progfest ’94, 1995

Awards 

 Philip Frost Award for Excellence in Teaching and Scholarship, 2020
 Proclamation “John Daversa Day”, The City of Miami Beach, February 23, 2020
 Grammy Award for Best Large Jazz Ensemble, American Dreamers: Voices of Hope, Music of Freedom, John Daversa Big Band Featuring DACA Artists, 2019
 Grammy Award for Best Arrangement, Instrumental or A Capella, "Stars and Stripes Forever”, 2019
 Grammy Award for Best Improvised Solo "Don’t Fence Me In”, 2019
 Grammy Nomination for Best Large Jazz Ensemble, Kaleidoscope Eyes: Music of The Beatles, John Daversa, 2017
 Grammy Nomination for Best Arrangement Instrumental, "Lucy In The Sky With Diamonds", 2017
 Grammy Nomination Best Arrangement Vocals or Acapella "Do You Want To Know A Secret" featuring Renee Olstead, 2017
 Global Music Awards Gold Medal Winner, Large Jazz Ensemble, Kaleidoscope Eyes: Music of The Beatles, 2016
 Global Music Awards Gold Medal Winner, Composition/Composer, Kaleidoscope Eyes: Music of The Beatles, 2016
 Global Music Awards Gold Medal Winner, Band, Kaleidoscope Eyes: Music of The Beatles, 2016
 Global Music Awards Gold Medal Winner, Album, Kaleidoscope Eyes: Music of The Beatles, 2016
 Global Music Awards Gold Medal Winner, Innovation In Sound, Kaleidoscope Eyes: Music of The Beatles, 2016
 Global Music Awards Gold Medal Winner, Sound Mixing/Editing, Kaleidoscope Eyes: Music of The Beatles, 2016
 IAMA Songwriting Award, "Little Black Spider", 2012
 Global Music Awards, Best in Show, Junk Wagon: The Big Band Album, 2011
 Global Music Awards, Awards of Excellence for Creativity/Originality, Junk Wagon: The Big Band Album, 2011
 Global Music Awards, Awards of Excellence for Album Production, Junk Wagon: The Big Band Album, 2011
 Mellon Award for Excellence in Mentoring, Nomination, University of Southern California, 2010
 Jazz Studies Department Award, University of Southern California, 2009
 Semi-Finalist, Thelonious Monk Institute of Jazz, Jazz Trumpet Competition, 1998
 Second, International Trumpet Guild Carmine Caruso Jazz Soloist Competition, 1998
 Winner, International Trumpet Guild Jazz Soloist Competition, 1994
 Winner, National Trumpet Competition, 1993
 Performance Award, Herb Alpert Award 1991
 Performance Award, Italian Heritage Award 1991

References 

American jazz trumpeters
American male trumpeters
Living people
People from Canoga Park, Los Angeles
Grammy Award winners
21st-century trumpeters
21st-century American male musicians
American male jazz musicians
1972 births